The Careless Years is a 1957 film from United Artists directed by Arthur Hiller and produced by Edward Lewis.  The film was the directorial debut for Hiller. The film stars Dean Stockwell and Natalie Trundy in an early film appearance.

Plot
Two high school seniors from different social groups go on a date. He begins to fall for her when she resists his amorous advances and decides they should get married immediately. Both sets of parents object to the sudden nature of the proposal. He talks her into going to Mexico to get married, but they decide it is best to wait until they are older.

Main cast

Production
The film originally was called The Young Lovers. The female lead went to Natalie Trundy, who was then 16 and only had made one film. Bryna Productions signed her to a five-year contract. The male lead went to former child actor Dean Stockwell, who also was signed to a five-year contract.

It was the first feature as director for Arthur Hiller. He recalled he was offered the job, "read the script, and I liked it a lot, but I had reservations. And I thought 'Do I tell him [the producer] about my reservations? Or do I pretend I really just love it? I don't want to lose the job'. Finally I went about it honestly and just told them just what my feelings were. Those are my feelings, and I'm doing a rewrite, just on those items".

Critical reception
Bosley Crowther of The New York Times did not care for the movie: "The pace is slow, the writing uninspired and the approach to the issue is often naïve and repetitious."

See also
 List of American films of 1957

References

External links 
 
 

1957 films
Film noir
American romantic drama films
1957 romantic drama films
American coming-of-age drama films
1950s coming-of-age drama films
Films directed by Arthur Hiller
Films scored by Leith Stevens
Bryna Productions films
United Artists films
1957 directorial debut films
1950s English-language films
1950s American films